The United States's Grommet nuclear test series was a group of 34 nuclear tests conducted in 1971–1972. These tests followed the Operation Emery series and preceded the Operation Toggle series.

List of the nuclear tests

References

Explosions in 1971
Explosions in 1972
1971 in military history
1972 in military history
Grommet